Timothy Grant Hill (born February 25, 1993) is an American professional stock car racing driver and team owner. He competes part-time in the NASCAR Craftsman Truck Series, driving the No. 56 Toyota Tundra for his own team, Hill Motorsports and part-time in the NASCAR Xfinity Series, driving the No. 13/66 Toyota Supra and Chevrolet Camaro for MBM Motorsports.

Hill was born in Port Tobacco, Maryland, and began racing go-karts at the age of 12. In karting, he won two World Karting Association championships, two King George Speedway track championships, the Concord Speedway Winter Championship. Afterward, Hill raced in Legend cars, the Allison Legacy Series, the K&N Pro Series East and the ARCA Racing Series. In 2011, Hill moved to Rick Ware Racing in the Nationwide Series, where he won Rookie of the Year honors.

He is the son of former NASCAR driver Jerry Hill and brother of current NASCAR driver Tyler Hill, who shares driving duties and co-owns the No. 56 truck with Timmy.

Early career
Hill began his racing career in 2005 by karting at the age of 12.  During his first season, he recorded more than 80 victories, as well as winning two World Karting Association championships, two King George Speedway championships, and the Concord Speedway Winter Championship.  He also finished third in the World Karting Association National Championship. Once the 2005 season concluded, he began racing Bandoleros. In 2006, he scored ten wins. One year later, Hill began racing Legend cars and in the Allison Legacy Series. During the season, Hill failed to win a race. However, in 2008, he managed to win four Legend car races and two in the Allison Legacy Series. In the Allison Legacy Series, he finished fifth in the point standings.

During the 2009 season, Hill won ten Allison Legacy Series races and finished first in the point standings. In Legend cars, he won two races in the Winter Heat Series and won the Summer Shootout at Charlotte Motor Speedway. In the following year, he began racing in the ARCA Racing Series and the K&N Pro Series East while continuing racing Legend cars. In Legend cars, he won seven races, while recording two top-ten finishes in the K&N Pro Series and one in the ARCA Racing Series.

NASCAR

In 2011, Hill began racing in the NASCAR Nationwide Series at Phoenix International Raceway, having been too young to compete in the season opener at Daytona International Speedway, not yet having passed his eighteenth birthday. During the season, he had a best finish of 11th at Road America and finished 17th in the point standings, winning the Rookie of the Year award. After a close battle with Blake Koch and Ryan Truex, Hill edged Koch by a single point at Homestead-Miami Speedway to take Rookie of the Year honors. He competed in 33 of the 34 events scheduled for the season, and scored Top 20 finishes in five.

Hill returned to Rick Ware Racing in NASCAR for the 2012 season, also competing for the team in the 24 Hours of Daytona. Just before the start of the season, it was announced that Hill would move up to the Sprint Cup Series, driving the No. 37 Ford for Max Q Motorsports with an alliance with Rick Ware's team, and also competing for Rookie of the Year. Hill had originally been announced to compete in all Cup races that year except for the 2012 Daytona 500, where Mike Wallace, an experienced and successful plate driver, would drive the No. 37 instead of the rookie Hill to have a better chance of getting the team in the race (which they still did not). Hill would instead be given the chance to drive at Daytona that weekend in the Nationwide race for Ware in their No. 41 car, where he would go on to score his career-best finish of seventh after avoiding a last-lap crash.

Hill would fail to qualify in his first Cup attempt at Phoenix. However, he did qualify for the following race at Las Vegas, making his series debut there. However, he would crash and finish 42nd. After a poor start to the season and only qualifying for one race (Las Vegas) in his first four races, Hill decided to return to the Nationwide Series with RWR full-time for the rest of the season. Hill would still compete in a few Cup races later in the season, with three starts in the FAS Lane Racing No. 32 and one start at Talladega in the NEMCO Motorsports No. 97.

For 2013, Hill returned to the No. 32 team for a part-time schedule of 19 races with OXY Water and U. S. Chrome sponsorship, and declared for Sprint Cup Rookie of the Year honors (again)  He would finish third in the Rookie of the Year standings, behind full-time drivers Ricky Stenhouse Jr. and Danica Patrick.

Hill would drive the No. 33 Chevy part-time for Circle Sport in 2014 after starting the year without a ride after he was replaced in the No. 32 by Travis Kvapil that year. He was involved in a controversy at Bristol when, while running in last place, Hill failed to slow his car under caution and crashed into the rear of the stopped car of Matt Kenseth, who was running in second place at the time. Hill would later state that his spotter did not tell him the caution flag was out, and he did not see the safety lights around the track turn on. NASCAR on Fox analyst Darrell Waltrip famously called out Hill for a "rookie mistake" at the moment of the incident, though he recanted his harsh tone late in the broadcast. He also practiced and qualified Landon Cassill's No. 40 Circle Sport car at Sonoma when Cassill was in Road America for the Nationwide race that day. Hill would also drive in two races each for the Identity Ventures Racing and Xxxtreme Motorsports teams. IVR was a team with a limited alliance with Michael Waltrip Racing. At Pocono in June, he drove the No. 66 Toyota and would finish 36th. At New Hampshire in July, he drove the team's other car, the No. 87, to a 41st-place finish. In his two races in Xxxtreme's No. 44, Hill finished 43rd (at Dover) and 42nd (at Martinsville in October).

In 2015, Hill returned to Identity Ventures, now renamed Premium Motorsports, where he would drive part-time in both the No. 62 in the Cup Series and the No. 94 in the Truck Series and later the No. 98 in Cup as well after they bought the Phil Parsons Racing team. He made his first Xfinity Series (previously Nationwide) start of the season at Texas in the No. 13 for Carl Long's MBM Motorsports team. Hill would make 6 more starts with Long, but his best finish would come in his first of three starts with JGL Racing, where he finished 11th in the No. 26 Toyota at Daytona in July. In the Truck Series, Hill would run a total of 12 races for Premium Motorsports in the No. 49 Chevy Silverado. Nine races resulted in top 20 finishes with a best finish of 15th at Dover and Kentucky. Hill's 2015 Cup debut came in the July race at Loudon. His best finish came at Pocono, where he finished 36th. Hill would go on to run 11 more races for Premium Motorsports.  
 	
Hill's 2016 season started in the season-opening Truck race at Daytona, driving the No. 49 for Premium. After running up front in the Top 10 for most of the race, Hill was spun out while running in the Top 5 on the last lap, relegating him to 14th. As of September, Hill had run 11 Xfinity races with a best finish of 22nd at Loudon in the No. 13 for MBM. Hill announced in August that he would be running the remainder of the 2016 Xfinity Series season for MBM.

In 2017, Hill returned to Rick Ware Racing to drive the No. 51 in the Cup Series starting at the Daytona 500, but failed to qualify. Starting at Dover, Hill would drive for MBM Motorsports in the No. 66 as well at Kentucky and possibly more races. At the Brickyard 400, Hill avoided numerous incidents to record his and MBM's best finish, a 14th.

In 2018, Hill continued to drive for MBM at multiple levels, scoring his and MBM's first Top 10, a seventh at Daytona in July. He continued with MBM in 2019, earning a seventh-place finish at Bristol in August in a car that was fielded in collaboration with Hattori Racing Enterprises.

Hill made the starting lineup of the 2020 Daytona 500 after finishing 16th in Duel 2 of the 2020 Bluegreen Vacations Duels. That same weekend, Hill's Xfinity team was assessed a $50,000 and 75-point penalty in pre-race inspection due to extra body fillers; without his now-suspended crew chief Sebastian LaForge, Hill finished third in the race, his highest career finish.

When a portion of the 2020 season was postponed due to the COVID-19 pandemic, NASCAR drivers, including Hill, competed in the eNASCAR Pro Invitational Series on iRacing. At the second race that was held, the O'Reilly Auto Parts 125 on March 29, Hill scored a win in his virtual No. 66 MBM car at the virtual Texas Motor Speedway. A veteran iRacer, Hill had competed in 1,677 events and winning 673 of them, with the Texas race being his 674th.

Hill made the most NASCAR national series (Cup, Xfinity and Truck) starts of any driver in 2020, with a total of 75 races (all 36 in Cup, 29 of 33 in Xfinity, and 10 of 23 in Truck), ranking third all-time behind Kyle Busch (who accomplished this four years) and 2018 and 2019 holder Ross Chastain.

Hill got two Top 20's in 2020 (19th at Bristol). The second one came at the Yellawood 500 where due to a lot of front runners being involved in crashes, Hill ran in the Top 10 towards the end of the race, but Hill ran out of fuel and placed 15th, making it his third Cup series Top 20.

For 2021, MBM owner Carl Long announced in a Facebook post on December 19, 2020, that Hill would return to the team in 2021 to again run in the Cup and Xfinity Series, although he would run for Xfinity points this season. It has yet to be confirmed if Hill will run full-time in Cup as he did in 2020, but his Cup schedule will include the 2021 Daytona 500 in the No. 66, which will be a Ford in that race for the second straight year.

On August 28, 2022, during the Wawa 250, Hill achieved his and MBM's best finish in an Xfinity race by finishing second in that race driving the No. 13 Chevrolet with sponsorship from Coble Enterprises and VSI Racing, finishing behind a race-winning Jeremy Clements.

Team ownership

During the 2019 NASCAR Gander Outdoors Truck Series season, Hill formed Hill Motorsports, fielding the No. 56 Silverado part-time for himself and brother Tyler Hill; the number was used by their father Jerry during his career. The team used trucks acquired from MDM Motorsports over the 2018–2019 offseason.

The team debuted in the 2019 TruNorth Global 250 at Martinsville Speedway. In the second Martinsville race of the year, the NASCAR Hall of Fame 200, Hill escaped multiple wrecks to finish fifth.

Personal life
Hill became married in January 2018. His younger brother Tyler races part-time in the ARCA Racing Series, Xfinity, and Truck Series.

Motorsports career results

NASCAR
(key) (Bold – Pole position awarded by qualifying time. Italics – Pole position earned by points standings or practice time. * – Most laps led.)

Cup Series

Daytona 500

Xfinity Series

Craftsman Truck Series

K&N Pro Series East

K&N Pro Series West

Canadian Tire Series

 Season still in progress
 Ineligible for series points
 Hill started the 2012 season running for Cup points, but switched to the Nationwide Series starting at Texas in April.
 Hill started the 2021 season running for Xfinity points, but switched to the Truck Series starting at Darlington in May.

ARCA Racing Series
(key) (Bold – Pole position awarded by qualifying time. Italics – Pole position earned by points standings or practice time. * – Most laps led.)

24 Hours of Daytona
(key)

References

External links

 
 
 
 

Living people
1993 births
People from Port Tobacco Village, Maryland
Racing drivers from Maryland
24 Hours of Daytona drivers
NASCAR drivers
ARCA Menards Series drivers
Rolex Sports Car Series drivers
NASCAR team owners